Paul L. Hoefler (1893–1982) was a photographer, reporter and cinematographer who filmed wildlife and tribal scenes in Africa that were used in the popular documentary film Africa Speaks! produced by Walter Futter.

Early life
Paul Louis Hoefler was born on September 6, 1893 in Spokane, Washington. His parents were Caroline Louise and Otto Louis Hoefler and his brothers were Lucien, Dudley, George, Phillip, and Howard.

Career
Hoefler partnered with Walter Futter to make the film Africa Speaks!. He traveled to Africa and spent 14 months traveling across Africa, filming wild animals and various peoples. Film from an expedition to Africa was also spliced with film shot in Los Angeles to make the film. He wrote a book about the expedition and the making of the film entitled Africa Speaks.

References

External links
Site with a purported photo and brief synopsis about Hoefler

1893 births
1982 deaths
People from Spokane, Washington
American writers
American cinematographers